Huligal is a panchayat town in The Nilgiris district in the Indian state of Tamil Nadu.

Demographics
 India census, Huligal had a population of 17,048. Males constitute 50% of the population and females 50%. Huligal has an average literacy rate of 74%, higher than the national average of 59.5%: male literacy is 83%, and female literacy is 66%. In Huligal, 10% of the population is under 6 years of age.

References

Cities and towns in Nilgiris district